In the Heights is the soundtrack album to the 2021 American film In the Heights, based on the stage musical of the same name. The original tracks are written and composed by Lin-Manuel Miranda, who co-produced the track along with Alex Lacamoire, Bill Sherman and Greg Wells. The soundtrack album was released by  Atlantic Records and WaterTower Music on June 10, 2021, the same day as its U.S. release, and peaked at number one on Billboards Soundtracks Chart.

Development 
The track list was unveiled on April 21, 2021. The title track was made available with the album's pre-order on April 23, 2021. The song "96,000" was released via streaming on May 3, 2021. The film contains one new song, "Home All Summer", which plays during the end credits and is the last track on the album. "Piragua (Reprise)" is not listed in the tracklist as it is part of a post credits scene.

Track listing

Charts

References

External links 

 

2021 soundtrack albums
2021 compilation albums
Albums produced by Lin-Manuel Miranda
Musical film soundtracks
Drama film soundtracks
Atlantic Records soundtracks
Atlantic Records compilation albums
WaterTower Music soundtracks